Along the Road is an album by Susan Ashton, Margaret Becker, and Out of the Grey's Christine Denté, released in 1994.

Track listing 
"Angels" – 5:37 (Jennifer Kimball, Tom Kimmel)
"Song of Reconciliation" – 4:27 (Wayne Kirkpatrick)
"No Other" – 4:28 (Becker, Donna Douglas)
"Walk On" – 4:00 (Gayla and Jeff Borders)
"Breathe on Me" – 4:50 (Lowell Alexander, Billy Simon)
"Blessing in Disguise" – 3:21 (Kirkpatrick, Gordon Kennedy, Billy Sprague)
"Taking My Time" – 3:41 (Christine Denté, Charlie Peacock)
"Near to You" – 4:37 (Susan Ashton, Gary Chapman)
"Oh Me of Little Faith" – 3:56 (Kim Patton, Michael Puryear)
"What Am I" – 3:16 (Kirkpatrick, Sprague)
"Waiting to Be Found" – 4:17 (Kirkpatrick, Sprague)
"Along the Road" – 4:41 (Dan Fogelberg)

Personnel 

Main performers
 Susan Ashton – lead vocal ("Song of Reconciliation", "Walk On", "Near to You", "Waiting to Be Found"), backing vocals
 Margaret Becker – lead vocal ("No Other", "Blessing in Disguise", "Oh Me of Little Faith", "Along the Road"), backing vocals 
 Christine Denté – lead vocal ("Angels", "Breathe on Me", "Taking My Time", "What Am I"), backing vocals 

Musicians
 Carl Marsh – Fairlight strings (1, 4), keyboards (5, 7), Hammond B3 organ (8, 11)
 John Mark Painter – accordion (3), string quartet arrangements (12)
 Shane Keister – keyboards (5), Wurlitzer electric piano (7)
 Wayne Kirkpatrick – acoustic guitar (1–5, 8, 10, 11, 12), acoustic piano (2), hi-string guitar (10), electric guitar (11)
 Gordon Kennedy – acoustic guitar solo (1), electric guitar (2, 3, 4, 6–10), 12-string electric guitar (2), dobro (4), hi-string guitar (8, 10), talk box (9), finger snaps (9), floor stomps (9), acoustic guitar (11)
 John D. Wills – mandolin (1), "cowboy" guitar (6), guitar bells (10)
 Jerry McPherson – electric guitar (3–9, 11), finger snaps (9), floor stomps (9)
 Jerry Douglas – Weissenborn guitar (5), lap steel guitar (9), finger snaps (9), floor stomps (9)
 Jerry Kennedy – electric guitar (6)
 Scott Denté – acoustic guitar (7)
 Jimmie Lee Sloas – bass (1, 2, 9, 11), finger snaps (9), floor stomps (9)
 Tommy Sims – bass (3–8, 10)
 Steve Brewster – drums (1–4, 6, 9, 11), percussion (1, 10), tambourine (9), snare drum (9), finger snaps (9), floor stomps (9)
 John Hammond – drums (5, 7, 8)
 John Catchings – cello (12)
 Kristin Wilkinson – viola (12)
 David Davidson – violin (12)
 Pamela Sixfin – violin (12)

Production
 Wayne Kirkpatrick – producer
 Peter York – executive producer
 D'Ann McAlister – production assistant
 JB – recording engineer, mixing
 Shawn McLean – assistant tracking engineer
 Todd Robbins – mix assistant
 Wayne Mehl – technical assistant
 The Bennett House, Franklin, Tennessee – track recording location
 The Beanstalk, Brentwood, Tennessee – overdubs recording location
 Mole End, Franklin, Tennessee – mix studio
 Hank Williams – mastering at MasterMix, Nashville, Tennessee
 Karen Philpott – art direction
 Margo Chase – landscape photography
 Mark Tucker – portrait photography
 Johnny Villanueva – hair and makeup

References 

1994 albums